The Apco Prima is an Israeli single-place, paraglider that was designed and produced by Apco Aviation of Caesarea. It has been in production since the early 1990s and remained in production through 2016.

Design and development
The Prima was designed as a beginner glider for use in flight training of students for both gliding and  paramotor flying.

The glider is made from Gelvenor 42 g/m2 "Zero Porosity" ripstop nylon.

The design has progressed through four generations of models, the Prima, Prima 2, 3 and 4, each improving on the last. The Prima 4 incorporates leading edge battens and an improved landing flare capability. The models are each named for their rough wing area in square metres.

Variants
Prima II 22
Small-sized model for lighter pilots.
Prima II 30
Large-sized model for heavier pilots. The glider model is AFNOR Standard certified.
Prima 4 22
Extra small-sized model for lighter pilots. The glider model is not certified.
Prima 4 24
Small-sized model for light-weight pilots. The glider model is CEN/AFNOR Standard certified.
Prima 4 27
Mid-sized model for medium-weight pilots. The glider model is CEN/AFNOR Standard certified.
Prima 4 30
Large-sized model for heavier pilots. The glider model is CEN/AFNOR Standard certified.
Prima 4 33
Extra large-sized model for heavier pilots. The glider model is not certified.

Specifications (Prima II 30)

References

External links
Official website

Prima
Paragliders